From mid- to late-May 2019, a prolonged and extensive tornado outbreak sequence affected much of the United States. Over a 14-day period, 392 tornadoes touched down across 23 states.

Confirmed tornadoes

May 17 event

May 18 event

May 19 event

May 20 event

May 21 event

May 22 event

May 23 event

May 24 event

May 25 event

May 26 event

May 27 event

May 28 event

May 29 event

May 30 event

See also
 Tornadoes of 2019
 List of United States tornadoes in May 2019
 Tornado outbreak sequence of May 2019

Notes

References

Tornado outbreak 2019-05
Tornado outbreak 2019-05
Tornado outbreak 2019-05
Tornado outbreak 2019-05
Tornado outbreak 2019-05
Tornado outbreak
Tornado outbreak 2019-05
Tornado outbreak 2019-05
Tornadoes in Arizona
Tornadoes in Arkansas
Tornadoes in California
Tornadoes in Colorado
Tornadoes in Florida
Tornadoes in Idaho
Tornadoes in Illinois
Tornadoes in Indiana
Tornadoes in Iowa
Tornadoes in Kansas
Tornadoes in Maryland
Tornadoes in Michigan
Tornadoes in Minnesota
Tornadoes in Missouri
Tornadoes in Nebraska
Tornadoes in New Mexico
Tornadoes in Nevada
Tornadoes in North Dakota
Tornadoes in Ohio
Tornadoes in Oklahoma
Tornadoes in Pennsylvania
Tornadoes in Texas
Tornadoes in Wisconsin
Tornadoes of 2019
2019-05 Tornado outbreak